To Love Ru is an anime series based on the manga of the same name written by Saki Hasemi and illustrated by Kentaro Yabuki. 

A fourth and final season of the anime series titled, To Love Ru Darkness 2nd, aired in Japan between July 7 and October 29, 2015. The opening theme is "secret arms" by Ray while the ending theme is "Gardens" by Mami Kawada. Sentai Filmworks released To Love Ru Darkness 2nd on DVD and Blu-ray in North America on November 1, 2016.


Episode list

References

Season 4
2015 Japanese television seasons